Park Jun-yong (born 27 February 1991) is a South Korean mixed martial artist who competes in the Middleweight division of the Ultimate Fighting Championship.

Mixed martial arts career

Early career

Starting his career in 2013, Park compiled a 10-3 record, fighting mainly for a various regional Asian promotions, with his most memorable win being against future Professional Fighters League Welterweight champ, Ray Cooper III.

Ultimate Fighting Championship
Park made his UFC debut during UFC Fight Night: Andrade vs. Zhang. He lost this fight by anaconda choke.

Park next faced Marc-André Barriault on December 21, 2019 at UFC Fight Night 165. He won the fight via unanimous decision.

Park was expected to face Trevin Giles on August 1, 2020 at UFC Fight Night 173.  However, Park was removed from the bout on July 23 due to alleged travel restrictions related to the COVID-19 pandemic.

Park faced John Phillips on October 17, 2020 at UFC Fight Night: Ortega vs. The Korean Zombie. He won the fight via unanimous decision. Park landed 258 ground strikes during the fight, breaking the previous record of 251 ground strikes landed in a three-round fight set by Matt Riddle 11 years prior.

Park faced Tafon Nchukwi on May 8, 2021 at UFC on ESPN 24. He won the fight via majority decision.

Park faced Gregory Rodrigues on October 23, 2021 at UFC Fight Night: Costa vs. Vettori. He lost the fight via knockout in round two. This fight earned him Fight of the Night award.

Park faced Eryk Anders on May 21, 2022 at UFC Fight Night 206. He won the bout via split decision.

Park faced Joseph Holmes on October 29, 2022 at UFC Fight Night 213. He won the fight via rear-naked choke in round two.

Park faced Denis Tiuliulin on February 4, 2023 at UFC Fight Night 218. He won the fight via rear-naked choke in round one.

Championships and accomplishments 
Ultimate Fighting Championship
Fight of the Night (One time) 
Yawara FC
Yawara FC Middleweight Championship (One time)

Mixed martial arts record

|-
|Win
|align=center|16–5
|Denis Tiuliulin
|Technical Submission (rear-naked choke)
|UFC Fight Night: Lewis vs. Spivak
|
|align=center|1
|align=center|4:05
|Las Vegas, Nevada, United States
|
|-
|Win
|align=center|15–5
|Joseph Holmes
|Submission (rear-naked choke)
|UFC Fight Night: Kattar vs. Allen
|
|align=center|2
|align=center|3:04
|Las Vegas, Nevada, United States
|
|-
|Win
|align=center|14–5
|Eryk Anders
|Decision (split)
|UFC Fight Night: Holm vs. Vieira
|
|align=center|3
|align=center|5:00
|Las Vegas, Nevada, United States
|
|-
| Loss
|align=center|13–5
|Gregory Rodrigues
|KO (punches)
|UFC Fight Night: Costa vs. Vettori
|
|align=center|2
|align=center|3:13
|Las Vegas, Nevada, United States
|
|-
|Win
|align=center|13–4
|Tafon Nchukwi
|Decision (majority)
|UFC on ESPN: Rodriguez vs. Waterson
|
|align=center|3
|align=center|5:00
|Las Vegas, Nevada, United States
|
|-
|Win
|align=center|12–4
|John Phillips
|Decision (unanimous)
|UFC Fight Night: Ortega vs. The Korean Zombie
|
|align=center|3
|align=center|5:00
|Abu Dhabi, United Arab Emirates
|
|-
|Win
|align=center|11–4
|Marc-André Barriault
| Decision (unanimous)
| UFC Fight Night: Edgar vs. The Korean Zombie
| 
| align=center|3
| align=center|5:00
| Busan, South Korea
|
|-
|Loss
|align=center|10–4
|Anthony Hernandez
|Submission (anaconda choke)
|UFC Fight Night: Andrade vs. Zhang 
|
|align=center|2
|align=center|4:39
|Shenzhen, China
|
|-
|Win
|align=center|10–3
|Matvey Ivanenko
|TKO (punches)
|Real Fight: Double Impact
|
|align=center|3
|align=center|0:58
|Khabarovsk, Russia
|
|-
|Win
|align=center|9–3
|Glenn Sparv
|Decision (unanimous)
|RFC Way of the Dragon 2: Taiwan Pro Combat Championship
|
|align=center|3
|align=center|5:00
|Taipei City, Taiwan
|
|-
| Win
| align=center| 8–3
| John Vake
| TKO (punches)
| Hex Fight Series 13
| 
| align=center| 2
| align=center| 1:33
| Melbourne, Australia
| 
|-
| Win
| align=center| 7–3
| Koji Shikuwa
| TKO (punches)
| HEAT 41
| 
| align=center| 3
| align=center| 1:57
| Nagoya, Japan
| 
|-
| Win
| align=center| 6–3
| Jung Se-yoon
| Submission (rear-naked choke)
| TFC 15
| 
| align=center| 1
| align=center| 2:25
| Seoul, South Korea
| 
|-
| Win
| align=center| 5–3
|Ray Cooper III
|Submission (anaconda choke)
|Pacific Xtreme Combat 56
|
|align=center|1
|align=center|N/A
|Hagåtña, Guam
| 
|-
| Win
| align=center| 4–3
| Grigoriy Sirenko
| Submission (rear-naked choke)
| MFP 204: Cup Of Vladivostok 2016
| 
| align=center| 1
| align=center| 2:23
| Vladivostok, Russia
| 
|-
| Loss
| align=center| 3–3
| Shavkat Rakhmonov
| Submission (rear-naked choke)
| KZMMAF: Battle of Nomads 9
| 
| align=center| 2
| align=center| 1:51
| Hwasun, South Korea
| 
|-
| Win
| align=center| 3–2
| Oleg Olenichev
| TKO (retirement)
| Art of War 16: Return of the King
| 
| align=center| 1
| align=center| 10:00
| Beijing, China
| 
|-
| Loss
| align=center| 2–2
| Son Sung-won
| Decision (split)
| Top FC 9: Battle of Incheon
| 
| align=center| 3
| align=center| 5:00
| Incheon, South Korea
|
|-
| Win
| align=center| 2–1
| Kim Jae-woong
| KO (knee)
| Top FC 6: Unbreakable Dream
| 
| align=center| 2
| align=center| 0:00
| Seoul, South Korea
| 
|-
| Win
| align=center| 1–1
| Kim Yul
| Decision (unanimous)
| Top FC 5: Busan
| 
| align=center| 3
| align=center| 5:00
| Busan, South Korea
| 
|-
| Loss
| align=center| 0–1
| Kim Jae-young
| Decision (unanimous)
| Top FC: National League 1
| 
| align=center| 2
| align=center| 5:00
| Seoul, South Korea
|

See also 
 List of current UFC fighters
 List of male mixed martial artists

References

External links 
 
 

1991 births
Living people
South Korean male mixed martial artists
Sportspeople from Seoul
Middleweight mixed martial artists
Ultimate Fighting Championship male fighters